The Amarillo Wranglers are a Tier II junior ice hockey team in the North American Hockey League's South Division. The team's home arena is the Amarillo Civic Center in Amarillo, Texas.

History

Lone Star Cavalry
The Lone Star Cavalry were granted an expansion franchise in the America West Hockey League in March 2003. They stayed in the league when it merged with the North American Hockey League for the 2003–04 season. The Cavalry played out of the Blue Line Ice Complex in North Richland Hills, Texas and served the immediate "Mid-Cities" area of Metro Dallas-Fort Worth. The Cavalry were part of the NAHL's new South Division along with the Central Texas Blackhawks, Fairbanks Ice Dogs, Springfield (MO) Spirit, Texas Tornado, Texarkana Bandits, and Wichita Falls Rustlers.

Santa Fe RoadRunners
After financial difficulties caused the Cavalry's home rink, the Blue Line Ice Complex, to close, the Cavalry were left without a home. Due to this and other factors, the Cavalry ended up being sold and relocated to Santa Fe, New Mexico. The team was granted membership on September 20, 2004, and began play on September 25, 2004, under their new identity as the Santa Fe RoadRunners. The Santa Fe RoadRunners played out of the Genoveva Chavez Community Center in Santa Fe. In their inaugural season in New Mexico, the RoadRunners played in the South Division, against the Central Texas Marshals, Springfield (IL) Jr. Blues, Springfield Spirit, Texarkana Bandits, Texas Tornado, and the Wichita Falls Wildcats, finishing with a 33–15–8 record, good for 3rd place in the division. The following season they finished dead last in the South Division behind the Tornado, Bandits, Jr. Blues, and the Wildcats. The third and final season in Santa Fe saw the RoadRunners finishing with a 41–17–4 record for second place in a South Division that consisted of the St. Louis Bandits, Texas Tornado, Fairbanks Ice Dogs, Wichita Falls Wildcats, and the Alaska Avalanche.

Topeka RoadRunners

On February 26, 2007, the team announced their move to Topeka, Kansas, from Santa Fe, New Mexico, due to claims of poor attendance. Santa Fe ranked 17th out of 18 teams in attendance.

The move to Topeka was initiated by a grass roots effort, led by hockey fans from Topeka. In their first season in Topeka, 2007–08, they were third in league attendance while playing in Landon Arena. That season the team won the NAHL South Division and South Division Playoffs. They finished in third place at the Robertson Cup competition. The 2008–09 season saw the RoadRunners finishing fourth in league attendance and 2nd in the South Division. The team lost in the second round of the South Division playoffs. In 2009–10 The RoadRunners finished first in the South Division, and they were second in attendance. The 2010–11 season saw the RoadRunners claim the NAHL President's Cup as the league's regular season champions.

On January 7, 2016, the RoadRunners fired long-tenured head coach and general manager Scott Langer, who had been with the team since their days as the Cavalry and the head coach since their first season in Santa Fe. He was hired immediately after the season ended by the Aberdeen Wings. Former RoadRunner player and assistant coach Josh Kamrass was hired as his replacement. On November 24, 2017, assistant coach Justin DeMartino took over as an interim head coach, so that Kamrass could spend more time at home and took a front office job with the organization overseeing all the ownership's teams including their Tier III teams.

Topeka Pilots

On April 18, 2018, owners of the franchise since 2009, Barbara & Donald Stone, sold the franchise to Loretto Sports Ventures, a company owned by Lamar Hunt Jr., that also operates the Kansas City Mavericks in the ECHL. In the same press conference, Hunt announced the new head coach and general manager as Simon Watson for the 2018–19 season. The new ownership also announced the team would be rebranded and was renamed the Topeka Pilots on June 5, 2018.

Amarillo Wranglers
On February 28, 2020, Lamar Hunt Jr. announced he was moving the team to the Kansas City metropolitan area for the 2020–21 season. The team was renamed after the former NHL team, the Kansas City Scouts, and were to play at least the 2020–21 season at the Kansas City Ice Center in the suburb of Shawnee, Kansas. However, the team instead went dormant for the 2020–21 season due to the on-going COVID-19 pandemic with plans to return for the 2021–22 season. The Scouts also received dormancy status for the 2021–22 season on March 4, 2021, however, the team would never play a game as the Scouts.

On May 21, 2021, the NAHL announced Hunt had instead sold the team to Amarillo Ice Sports, LLC, a locally owned and operated group including Chris Wright, Roger Wright, and Amarillo hockey alumni Eric Andersen, and Austin Sutter. The new team was named after the original Amarillo Wranglers.  The Wranglers re-entered the league for the 2021–22 season, replacing the recently relocated Amarillo Bulls in the Amarillo Civic Center, with Harry Mahood as general manager and head coach. The Wranglers then hired Karlis Zirnis as director of player personnel.

Season-by-season records

Playoffs
2005
First Round – Texarkana Bandits defeated Santa Fe Roadrunners, 3-games-to-1
2007
First Round – Texas Tornado defeated Santa Fe Roadrunners, 3-games-to-2
2008
Division Semifinals – Topeka RoadRunners defeated Texas Tornado, 3-games-to-0
Division Final – Topeka RoadRunners defeated Fairbanks Ice Dogs, 3-games-to-2
Robertson Cup Round Robin – Topeka RoadRunners (2-1) - Advance to Semifinal, (W, 3-2 vs. Phantoms; W, 4-2 vs. Blizzard; L, 2-5 vs. Bandits)
Robertson Cup Semifinal Game – Mahoning Valley Phantoms defeated Topeka RoadRunners, 5-2 
2009
Division Semifinals – Topeka RoadRunners defeated Wichita Falls Wildcats, 3-games-to-2
Division Finals – St. Louis Bandits defeated Topeka RoadRunners, 3-games-to-1
2010
Division Semifinals – Topeka RoadRunners defeated Springfield Jr. Blues, 3-games-to-1
Division Finals – St. Louis Bandits defeated Topeka RoadRunners, 3-games-to-2
2011
Division Semifinals – Topeka RoadRunners defeated Wichita Falls Wildcats, 3-games-to-2
Division Finals – Amarillo Bulls defeated Topeka RoadRunners, 3-games-to-2
2012
Division Semifinals – Topeka RoadRunners defeated Texas Tornado, 3-games-to-0
Division Finals – Amarillo Bulls defeated Topeka RoadRunners, 3-games-to-1
2013
Division Semifinals – Texas Tornado defeated Topeka RoadRunners, 3-games-to-0
2014
Division Semifinals – Topeka RoadRunners defeated Rio Grande Valley Killer Bees, 3-games-to-0
Division Finals – Topeka RoadRunners defeated Amarillo Bulls, 3-games-to-2
Robertson Cup Semifinals – Austin Bruins defeated Topeka RoadRunners, 2-games-to-1
2015
First Round – Topeka RoadRunners defeated Wichita Falls Wildcats, 3-games-to-1
Robertson Cup Quarterfinals – Lone Star Brahmas defeated Topeka RoadRunners, 3-games-to-1
2016
Division Semifinals – Topeka RoadRunners defeated Lone Star Brahmas, 3-games-to-1
Division Finals – Wichita Falls Wildcats defeated Topeka RoadRunners, 3-games-to-0

Players

Team captains
 Eric Trax: 2003–04 Lone Star Cavalry
 Andrew Johnson: 2004–05 Santa Fe RoadRunners
 Brandon Vossberg: 2005–06 Santa Fe RoadRunners
 John Stoddard: 2006–07 Santa Fe RoadRunners and 2007–08 Topeka RoadRunners
 Matt Hartmann: 2008–09 Topeka RoadRunners
 Kurtis Anton: 2009–10 Topeka RoadRunners
 Michael Hill / Jordan Davis: 2010–11 Topeka RoadRunners
 Chris Bond: 2011–12 Topeka RoadRunners
 Drew Kariofiles: 2012–13 Topeka RoadRunners
 Jared Tafoya: 2013–14 Topeka RoadRunners
 Mike Gornall: 2014–15 Topeka RoadRunners
 Cam Strong / Dominic Lutz: 2015–16 Topeka RoadRunners
 Marshall Bowery: 2016–17 Topeka RoadRunners
 Nick Granowicz / Jake Rosenbaum / Nigel Nelson: 2017–18 Topeka RoadRunners
 Brenden Rons: 2018–19 Topeka Pilots
 Austin McCarthy: 2019-20 Topeka Pilots

Honored members
Retired numbers: The Topeka RoadRunners retired two numbers: the 11 of forward and team captain John Stoddard, and the 21 of Peter Halash.

On January 6, 2014, Topeka Roadrunner Peter Halash died in a car wreck. The Roadrunners team had a jersey retirement ceremony before a game against the Springfield Jr. Blues on March 23, 2014.

Alumni
The RoadRunners have had a number of alumni move on to NCAA Division I, NCAA Division III, ACHA Division I and II, higher levels of junior ice hockey, and professional ice hockey, including:

Eriah Hayes (2007–08, Topeka RoadRunners) – Played 19 games for the San Jose Sharks of the NHL
Cole Schneider (2009–10, Topeka RoadRunners) – Played for the Buffalo Sabres in the NHL and for the Binghamton Senators, Rochester Americans, and Hartford Wolf Pack in the AHL.

References

External links
Official Site
NAHL website

North American Hockey League teams
Sports in Topeka, Kansas
Ice hockey teams in Kansas
Ice hockey clubs established in 2007
Ice hockey clubs disestablished in 2020
2007 establishments in Kansas
2020 disestablishments in Kansas
Ice hockey teams in Texas
Sports in Amarillo, Texas